Potsin is a town in the Central region of Ghana. The town is known for the Potsin T.I. Ahmadiya Secondary School.  The school is a second cycle institution.

References

Populated places in the Central Region (Ghana)